Sir George Morton, 1st Baronet (died 1662) was an English landowner and politician who sat in the House of Commons in 1626.

Morton was the son of Sir George Morton of Milbourne St Andrew, Dorset and his wife Joan Holloway of Walton. He succeeded to the estate of Milborne on the death of his father in 1611, and was created baronet of Milbourne St Andrew in the County of Dorset on 1 March 1619. In 1626, he was elected Member of Parliament for Dorset. He was a faithful Royalist during the English Civil War.

Morton married firstly Catharine Hopton, daughter of Sir Arthur Hopton, of Witham. He married secondly Anne Willoughby,  widow of Sir Rotherham Willoughby who had died by July 1634, and daughter of Sir Richard Wortley, of Wortley, Yorkshire. He was succeeded by his son John.

References

|-

Year of birth missing
1662 deaths
Politicians from Dorset
English MPs 1626
Cavaliers
Baronets in the Baronetage of England